Rockdale is an unincorporated community in Jefferson County, in the U.S. state of Pennsylvania.

History
An early sawmill was built at Rockdale in 1831.

References

Unincorporated communities in Jefferson County, Pennsylvania
Unincorporated communities in Pennsylvania